The Meerut Conspiracy Case was a controversial court case that was initiated in British Raj in March 1929 and decided in 1933. Several trade unionists, including three Englishmen, were arrested for organizing an Indian railway strike. The British government convicted 27 leftist trade union leaders under a lawsuit. The trial immediately caught attention in England, where it inspired the 1932 play Meerut by a Manchester street theatre group, the Red Megaphones, highlighting the detrimental effects of colonisation and industrialisation.

Background
The British Government was clearly worried about the growing influence of the Communist International. It was also thoroughly convinced that all infiltration of communist and socialist ideas was propagated to the workers by the Communist Party of India (CPI). Its ultimate objective, the government perceived, was to achieve "complete paralysis and overthrow of existing Governments in every country (including India) by means of a general strike and armed uprising".
The government's immediate response was to foist yet another conspiracy case, the Meerut Conspiracy Case.

In more than one way, the trial helped the Communist Party of India to consolidate its position among workers. Dange, along with 32 other persons, was arrested on or about 20 March 1929  and put on trial under Section 121A of the Indian Penal Code: Whoever within or without British India conspires to commit any of the offenses punishable by Section 121 or to deprive the King of the sovereignty of British India or any part thereof, or conspires to overawe, by means of criminal force or the show of criminal force, the Government of India or any local Government, shall be punished with transportation for life, or any shorter term, or with imprisonment of either description which may extend to ten years.

Charges
The main charges were that in 1921 S.A. Dange, Shaukat Usmani and Muzaffar Ahmed joined a conspiracy to establish a branch of the Comintern in India and were helped by various persons, including the accused Philip Spratt and Benjamin Francis Bradley, who were sent to India later by the Communist International. The aim of the accused persons, according to the charges raised against them, was under section 121-A of the Indian Penal Code (Act 45 of 1860): to deprive the King Emperor of the sovereignty of British India, and for such purpose to use the methods and carry out the programme and plan of campaign outlined and ordained by the Communist International.

The Sessions Court in Meerut awarded stringent sentences to the accused in January 1933. Of the accused, 27 persons were convicted with various durations of 'transportation'. Muzaffar Ahmed was transported for life, and Dange, Spratt, Ghate, Joglekar and Nimbkar were awarded transportation for a period of 12 years. On appeal, in August 1933, the sentences of Ahmed, Dange and Usmani were reduced to three years by Sir Shah Sulaiman Chief Justice of the Allahabad High Court, on the grounds that the accused had already spent a considerable part of their sentence while they waited for the trial to be decided and because  in the case of political offences, arising out of the beliefs of the accused, severe sentences defeat their object. In practice such sentences confirm the offenders in their beliefs and create other offenders, thus increasing the evil and the danger to the public.

The sentences of the others convicted  were also reduced.

The convictions of Desai, Hutchinson, Mitra, Jhabwala, Sehgal, Kasle, Gauri Shankar, Kadara and Alve were also overturned on appeal.

Impact
All the accused were communists. The charges framed against them portrayed the British government's fear of the growth of communist ideas in India. In the trial, all of the accused were labelled as Bolsheviks. For four-and-a-half years, the defendants turned the courtroom into a public platform to espouse their cause. As a result, the  trial saw strengthening of the communist movement in the country. Harkishan Singh Surjeet, a former General Secretary of the Communist Party of India (Marxist), wrote about the aftermath of the Meerut Conspiracy Case:a Party with a centralised apparatus, came into being only after the release of the Meerut prisoners, in 1933. The Meerut Conspiracy Case, though launched to suppress the communist movement, provided the opportunity for Communists to propagate their ideas. It came out with its own manifesto and was affiliated to the Communist International in 1934.

See also
 Revolutionary movement for Indian independence

Further reading
  Meerut 1929-1932: Statement given in his own defence at Meerut Court, India, against a charge of " Conspiracy against the King " by Lester Hutchinson. Manchester Meerut Defence Committee, 1932.
 Meerut: Release the Prisoners! A Statement Upon the Meerut Trial and Sentences, by National Joint Council. Published by National Joint Council, 1933.
 Conspiracy at Meerut, by Lester Hutchinson. Ayer Publishing, 1972, .
 Meerut Conspiracy Case & the Left-wing in India, by Pramita Ghosh. Published by Papyrus, 1978.
 The Great Attack: Meerut Conspiracy Case, by Sohan Singh Josh. Published by People's Pub. House, 1979.
 Meerut Conspiracy Case and the Communist Movement in India, 1929-35, by Devendra Singh. Published by Research India, 1990.
 Judgment on the Meerut Communist Conspiracy Case, by Meerut (India). Sessions Court, R. L. Yorke, Adhir Chakravarti, State Archives of West Bengal. Published by State Archives of West Bengal, Education Dept., Govt. of West Bengal, 1991.

References

External links
 The Meerut Conspiracy Trial: Background, charges and sentences
 Meerut 1932 play, by Manchester street theatre group the Red Megaphones
 Meerut Conspiracy Case - Newspaper cuttings 1929 (link updated 12/2019)

1933 in case law
1933 in India
Communist Party of India
History of Uttar Pradesh
Political repression in British India
History of Meerut
Indian case law